The British Rail Class 413 (or 4-CAP) units were formed from 1982 by permanently coupling two Class 414 2-HAP units together. There were two sub-classes of units: class 413/2, units 3201–3213, converted in 1982 from phase 1 2 HAP units 6001-6049. These units were formed DTCsoL - MBSO - MBSO - DTCsoL, with the former driving equipment of the DMBSO decommissioned, giving the new designation;  and class 413/3, converted from the later phase 2 build units 6050–6173, units 3301–3311 (formed 1982, again with the MBSOs innermost) and 3321–3325 (formed 1991, with the DMBSO outermost giving the formation, DMBSO - TCsoL - TCsoL - DMBSO. The centre vehicles again had their driving equipment decommissioned.

Fleet list

Eleven Class 413/3 unit were converted in 1982 from 'Phase 2' 2-HAP units (6043-6173, later reclassified as Class 414/3). Units were marshalled with the driving motor vehicles in the centre. 

In 1991 a further five units (3321–3325) were converted from 'Phase 2' 2-HAP units (by now renumbered into the range 4301–4322). These units had the driving motors marshalled outermost.

Withdrawal
The final units were withdrawn in 1994/95. None survived into preservation.

References

413
Train-related introductions in 1982
750 V DC multiple units